Agnosia is a Spanish baroque retro-futuristic thriller directed by Eugenio Mira and written by Antonio Trashorras.

Plot 
A young woman, Joana Prats, suffers from agnosia, a strange, primary visual disease that is one of the neuropsychological disorders of perception. Although her eyes and ears are in perfect condition, her brain is not able to correctly interpret the stimuli it receives. Joana is the only person to know an industrial secret left behind by her late father and becomes the victim of a sinister plan to extract this information. Her captors plan to use her sensory condition to help extract the information that they so desperately want.

Cast 
 Eduardo Noriega as Carles
 Félix Gómez as Vicent
 Bárbara Goenaga as Joana Prats
 Martina Gedeck as Prevert
 Luis Zahera  as Mariano
 Jack Taylor as Meissner
 Sergi Mate as Artur Prats
 Miranda Makaroff as Nuria

Production 
Roxbury Pictures shot the film in December 2009 at Barcelona and Parc Nacional d'Aigüestortes Estany de Sant Maurici in Province of Lleida. It was the second film directed by producer Eugenio Mira and based on a screenplay by Antonio Trashorras. In the leads in the thriller acts Eduardo Noriega, Martina Gedeck, Bárbara Goenaga and Jack Taylor in his second feature film under Eugenio Mira.

Release 
The film was released in February 2010 on the European Film Market. The theatrical release is anticipated in October 2010.

References

External links 
 

2010 films
2010 thriller drama films
2010 psychological thriller films
Spanish thriller drama films
2010s Spanish-language films
Films set in the 19th century
Films shot in Spain
2010 drama films
2010s Spanish films
Spanish psychological thriller films